CBC Kids is a Canadian children's block on CBC Television. The block was launched as Hodge Podge Lodge in 1987 and contains programming targeted at children. The block airs on weekdays from 7:00 a.m. to 11:00 a.m., Saturdays from 6:00 a.m. to noon and Sundays from 6:00 a.m. to 8:00 a.m.

Its French-language counterpart is Zone Jeunesse on ICI Radio-Canada Télé, which airs on weekdays from 5:00 a.m. to 9:00 a.m., Saturdays from 6:00 a.m. to 11:00 a.m. and Sundays from 6:00 a.m. to 10:00 a.m.

History

Hodge Podge Lodge (1987–1994)
From 1987 to 1992, CBC's two-hour morning block of children's programs was called Hodge Podge Lodge (not to be confused with the earlier American series of the same name). CBC's afternoon children's programs during this time were presented under generic CBC branding instead. CBC Children's Publicist Barbara Chernin and Producer Stephen Wrigh came up with the "Hodge Podge Lodge" moniker. Angela Bruce, Head of CBC Children's Programming, consented to the name for the lineup. The Hodge Podge Lodge interstitials featured animated multi-coloured geometric shapes, art supplies, and blocks moving around to music.

Following CBC's rebrand in November 1992, the Hodge Podge Lodge interstitials were replaced with new ones featuring a group of animated animals. A new character was introduced and a contest was held to name the character.

CBC Playground (1994–2000)
Former theatre director Peter Moss became CBC's head of children's programming in 1993, and the following winter, the CRTC complained about CBC's lack of children's programming and presence of U.S. shows on weekday afternoons. On October 24, 1994, the lineup was renamed CBC Playground; the block expanded to 9:30 a.m. with a half-hour block of children's series from around the world. European series requiring narration were recorded in Toronto with the voices of Martha Henry, Colm Feore and Albert Schultz. CBC said all programs between 9:30 a.m. and 11:00 a.m. will be Canadian within two years, as twelve shows for the block's first half-hour went into development.

In 1998, Adrian Mills became CBC's new head of daytime programming, and CBC Playground was relaunched and expanded by an hour. Two presenters, Lisa Richardson and Drew Carnwath, were added to the block, and virtual sets began to be used. CBC became a partner in the Get Set For Life campaign, which aimed to share information on development in preschoolers, alongside non-profit parenting organization Invest in Kids and Canadian Living magazine. CBC Playgrounds "Parenting with the Zap Family" interstitials were produced as part of the campaign.

Get Set For Life (2000–2003)
In 2000, CBC Playground was replaced with Get Set For Life, a block named after the campaign of the same name. This iteration had Alyson Court and Michael Clarke as its hosts.

By 2002, Cheryl Hassen had replaced Mills as CBC's head of children's programming.

Kids' CBC (2003–2016)

Kids' CBC started in 2003, replacing Get Set For Life. Previous hosts Court and Clarke continued to appear until December 2005, but the main focus was on five regional hosts from various parts of Canada. The hosts were Patty Sullivan (Ontario), Joyce Quansah (Quebec), Kush Uppal (British Columbia/Western Canada), Hayley Gene (Manitoba/Prairies), and Dashi Malone (Newfoundland and Labrador/Atlantic Canada). The look and the studio sets had also been drastically changed. The girl seen in the Get Set For Life logo was redesigned into an animated girl named Dot.

Kim Wilson took over from Hassen as CBC's children's programming head in 2005.

On December 24, 2005, a set consisting of a garden in a geometric type dome was added to the block (the block previously featured animated interstitials in which the presenters would appear). Malone and Gene were replaced by Mark O'Brien and Holly Bernier.

In 2007, the garden was removed. The set was changed to a Canadian village-type setting that had a circle floor and a treehouse was added. Due to the CBC's budget restrictions, the show was restricted to being hosted from Toronto by Sullivan, with Sid Bobb coming in as a co-host.

New characters arrived to feature various parts of Canadian culture, each representing a different Canadian region: 
 Mamma Yamma is a yam that represents Ontario. She is the owner of a fruit and vegetable stand in Toronto's Kensington Market.
 Drumheller is a skeleton dinosaur that represents Western Canada. He is from the archaeological site near Drumheller, Alberta.
 Saumon de Champlain is a fictionalized salmon version of Samuel de Champlain that represents Quebec, who lives at the Château Frontenac in Quebec City.
 Captain Claw is a lobster that represents Atlantic Canada. He is a lighthouse keeper in Peggy's Cove, Nova Scotia.
 Canada is a green, abstract animated representation of the map of the eponymous country.

Each of the puppets were used in a variety of scenes in their local setting, typically educational in nature. Mamma Yamma would frequently host cameos by visiting celebrities such as musicians or Canadian television personalities; a compilation album of live performances, Mamma Yamma and Friends, was released in 2008.
 
In 2013, the Kids' CBC style was changed. Drumheller, Saumon, Captain Claw, and Canada were removed. A new theme song titled "You and Me and Kids' CBC" was added. New segments were also added.

CBC Kids (2017–present)
On June 23, 2016, CBC announced that Kids' CBC would be rebranded as CBC Kids the following winter. Presenters Sullivan and Bobb were removed. Mamma Yamma was also removed. CBC Kids replaced Kids' CBC on January 2, 2017. The current hosts of this block are Janaye Upshaw and Tony Kim. Victor Verbitsky was a host until 2018. The current puppets are Gary the Unicorn, Cottonball the Cat, Mr. Orlando the Moose, Makeup Monster, and Putter the Computer.

The block's current format blends scripted children's programming with live-action segments featuring Upshaw, Kim and the puppet characters, called The Studio K Show.

Currently, Marie McCann is the head of children's content at CBC.

Programming

Current programming

 Addison (2018–present)
 The Adventures of Paddington (2020–present)
 Becca's Bunch (2018–2020, 2022–present)
 Big Blue (2021–present)
 The Bravest Knight (2021–present)
 CBC Kids News Explains (short series)
 Daisy & the Gumboot Kids (2019–present)
 Detention Adventure (2019–present)
 Dino Ranch (2021–present)
 Dot. (2016–present)
 Gary's Magic Fort (2021–present)
 Gisele's Mashup Adventures (2023–present) (short series)
 Glowbies (2021–present)
 Jeremy and Jazzy (2022–present) (short series)
 Kingdom Force (2019–present)
 Kiri and Lou (2019–present)
 Love Monster (2020–present)
 Mighty Express (2021–present)
 Molly of Denali (2019–present)
 Ollie! The Boy Who Became What He Ate (2017–present)
 PAW Patrol (2022–present)
 PJ Masks (2018–present)
 Remy & Boo (2020–present)
 Rusty Rivets (2019–present)
 Scout & the Gumboot Kids (2015–present)
 Street Cents Group Chat (2022–present)
 Super Agent Jon le Bon (2018–present) (short series)
 The Thrillusionists (2018–2020; 2022–present)
 True and the Rainbow Kingdom (2018–present)
 Ukulele U (2022–present)
 Wandering Wenda (2017–present)

Upcoming programming
 Mittens and Pants (February 13, 2023)
 Bestest Day Ever With My Best Friend! (2023)
 Hello Kitty: Super Style! (2023)
 Lu & The Bally Bunch (2023)
 Aunty B's House (2023)
 Dylan (TBA)

Former programming

 Ace Lightning (2002–2006)
 The Adventures of Napkin Man! (2013–2020)
 Amigo and Me (1999–2000; 2003–2004)
 Animalia (2007–2009)
 Animal Mechanicals (2007–2017)
 Are We There Yet?: World Adventure (2010–2016)
 The Art Show (2018–2019)
 Arthur (1998–2021)
 Artzooka! (2010–2018)
 The Babaloos (1997–2003)
 Babar (1989–1991)
 Barney & Friends (1995)
 Beat Bugs (2018–2022)
 Big Block SingSong (2012–2022)
 The Blobheads (2003–2004)
 Bo on the Go! (2007–2017)
 Bookaboo (2013–2019)
 Bruno and the Banana Bunch (2008–2013)
 Busytown Mysteries (2008–2015)
 The Busy World of Richard Scarry (1999–2000)
 Canadian Sesame Street (1972–1996)
 The Cat in the Hat Knows a Lot About That! (2011–2019)
 CBCNews.real (2000–2002)
 CBC Playground (1994–1998)
 The Adventures of Spot
 Dig & Dug with Daisy
 Little Rabbit
 Max the Cat
 Miffy
 Old Bear Stories
 Plastinots
 Picture Perfect
 Sharon, Lois & Bram Sing A to Z
 Tom and Tim
 Wiggly Pics
 Works
 Chirp (2015–2019)
 Clifford the Big Red Dog (2000–2007)
 Clifford's Puppy Days (2003–2004)
 Cross Country Fun Hunt (2012–2017)
 Curious George (2006–2009)
 Cyberchase (2002–2005)
 Daniel Tiger's Neighbourhood (2013–2022)
 Dex Hamilton: Alien Entomologist (2010–2012)
 dirtgirlworld (2009–2015)
 Does It Fart? (2019–2020) (short series)
 The Doodlebops (2004–2015)
 The Doodlebops Rockin' Road Show (2010–2015)
 The Doozers (2013–2014)
 Dragon Booster (2004–2010)
 Dragon Tales (2000–2006)
 Ebb and Flo (2006–2007)
 The Edison Twins (1984–1989)
 Endlings (2020)
 Find Me in Paris (2019–2020)
 Fraggle Rock (1983–1988)
 Franklin (1999–2007)
 Fred Penner's Place (1985–1997)
 The Friendly Giant (1958–1987)
 The Furchester Hotel (2017–2022)
 Fuzzy Tales (2012–2016)
 George Shrinks (2009–2011)
 Gofrette (2007–2011)
 Guess What? (1996–2000)
 Hippo Tub Company (2001–2003)
 Holy Baloney (2018–2020) (short series)
 Horrible Histories (2001–2002)
 Incredible Story Studios (2001–2002)
 Inuk (2001–2002)
 Jessie and the Gumboot Kids (2018–2019)
JiggiJump (2013–2015)
 The Kids of Degrassi Street (1982–1988)
 Lazoo (2017–2019)
 Little Bear (1995–2007)
 The Longhouse Tales (2001–2002)
 Lunar Jim (2006–2014)
 Magi-Nation (2007–2012)
 Maya the Bee (1983–1984)
 The Magic School Bus (2000–2003)
 Me Too! (2002–2006)
 The Mighty Jungle (2008–2017)
 The Moblees (2014–2021)
 Monster Math Squad (2012–2016)
 Mr. Dressup (1967–2006)
 Mr. Meaty (2005–2009)
 Mumble Bumble (1999–2005)
 My Goldfish Is Evil (2006–2016)
 Nanalan' (2003–2007)
 Noddy (1998–2003)
 OWL/TV (1985–1988)
 Pablo (2018–2019)
 Pelswick (2000–2003)
 Pinky Dinky Doo (2006–2008)
 Pingu (1997–2000)
 Pirates: Adventures in Art (2010–2016)
 Poko (2003–2016)
 Polka Dot Shorts (1998–2000)
 POV Sports (2003–2004)
 The Raccoons (1985–2000)
 Razzberry Jazzberry Jam (2009–2012)
 RECAP (2019–2020)
 Ride or Wrong (2015–2020)
 RoBOTiK (2022)
 Rolie Polie Olie (1998–2007)
 Ruby Skye P.I. (2014–2017)
 The Save-Ums! (2003–2010)
 Scoop and Doozie (1999–2003)
 The Secret World of Og (2006–2008)
 See the Sea (2008–2013)
 Sesame Park (1996–2001)
 Sharon, Lois & Bram's Elephant Show (1984–1990) 
 Shoebox Zoo (2004–2006)
 Skinnamarink TV (1997–2003)
 Slim Pig (2001–2012)
 Small Talk (2018–2019)
 Snapshots (2016)
 Spynet (2002–2006)
 Stella and Sam (2018–2022)
 Street Cents (1989–2006)
 Super Gran (1985–1986; 1988)
 Super Why! (2007–2019)
 Surprise! It's Edible Incredible! (2004–2016)
 Switchback (1985–1990)
 Taina (2003–2004)
 Theodore Tugboat (1993–2003)
 Time Tremors (2013–2016)
 Tiny Planets (2002–2005)
 Tractor Tom (2003–2006)
 Turbo Dogs (2009–2013)
 Under the Umbrella Tree (1987–1995)
 Vid Kids (1985–1988)
 What's New? (1972–1989)
 What's Your News? (2009–2016)
 Wilbur (2006–2009)
 Will's Jams (2013–2020)
 Wimzie's House (1996–2000)
 The Wonder Gang (2021–2022)
 Wonderstruck (1986–1992)
 Worldsagents (2005–2014)
 Yam Roll (2006–2010)
 You & Me (2013–2019)
 Zoboomafoo (2000–2007)
 Zoe and Charlie (2001)

References

External links
 Official site

Canadian television shows featuring puppetry

Children's television networks in Canada
Television programming blocks in Canada
Preschool education television networks